Shahnawaz alias Ajmal Pahari (Urdu: اجمل پہاڑی) is a target killer belonging to Muttahida Qaumi Movement and his Leader Saeed Bharam. On-camera he confessed of involvement in at least 600 murders and a wanted militant in four murder cases to the Korangi, Liaquatabad and Bilal Colony Police Stations that took place during 2004 to 2008. He also confessed that he got training from Indian Army officers for nearly six months.

References

Living people
Pakistani assassins
Year of birth missing (living people)